Mardos (Μάρδος) may refer to:
Bardiya, a king of Persia
Amardus, a river of ancient Media
Moardăș, a village now in Romania